Navia aloifolia is a species of plant in the genus Navia. This species is endemic to Venezuela.

References

aloifolia
Flora of Venezuela